Balakhna is the name of several inhabited localities in Russia.

Urban localities
Balakhna, a town in Balakhninsky District of Nizhny Novgorod Oblast; administratively incorporated as a town of district significance

Rural localities
Balakhna, Ivanovo Oblast, a village in Furmanovsky District of Ivanovo Oblast
Balakhna, Lipetsk Oblast, a selo in Ksizovsky Selsoviet of Zadonsky District of Lipetsk Oblast
Balakhna, Perevozsky District, Nizhny Novgorod Oblast, a village in Ichalkovsky Selsoviet of Perevozsky District of Nizhny Novgorod Oblast
Balakhna, Tula Oblast, a village in Shakhtersky Rural Okrug of Bogoroditsky District of Tula Oblast